Anthonie Jansz van der Croos (1606/07–1662/63), was a Dutch painter, draughtsman and poet.

Though probably born and raised in Alkmaar, from 1634 on Croos lived and worked mostly in The Hague. He primarily painted landscapes. For example, a Dutch landscape (Paesaggio olandese, in Italian) by van der Croos belongs to Pedriali collection (Collezione Pedriali) in the City Museum of Forlì (Italy).

He was influenced by Jan van Goyen.  He died in The Hague between 8 March 1662 and 14 September 1663.

References

Anthonie Jansz van der Croos on artnet

1600s births
1660s deaths
Dutch Golden Age painters
Dutch male painters
People from Alkmaar